Mockingbird Creek is a  long 2nd tributary to Barren Creek in Wicomico County, Maryland.

Course
Mockingbird Creek rises about 0.25 miles northeast of Susan Beach Corner in Sussex County, Delaware and then flows west-southwest into Wicomico County, Maryland to join Barren Creek about 1.5 miles west of Mardela Springs.

Watershed
Mockingbird Creek drains  of area, receives about 44.5 in/year of precipitation, has a topographic wetness index of 707.04 and is about 14% forested.

See also
List of Delaware rivers
List of Maryland rivers

References

Rivers of Delaware
Rivers of Maryland
Rivers of Sussex County, Delaware
Rivers of Wicomico County, Maryland
Tributaries of the Nanticoke River